Mula Ram is a former minister of social justice in Jammu and Kashmir, India. He is a leader of Indian National Congress. He elected was Raipur-Domana and Marh constituency in Jammu and Kashmir Legislative Assembly.

References

Living people
People from Jammu
Indian National Congress politicians from Jammu and Kashmir
Jammu and Kashmir MLAs 2002–2008
Year of birth missing (living people)